The 2019–20 Michigan Stars FC season was the club's first season playing in the National Independent Soccer Association, a newly established third division soccer league in the United States, and first professional season.

Overview
Michigan Stars FC was admitted into the National Independent Soccer Association on September 23, 2019 and latter fully accepted by the U.S. Soccer Federation on December 11, 2019, and will start competing in the 2020 Spring season. The team will play its home matches at a temporary outdoor venue at the Ultimate Soccer Arenas in Pontiac, Michigan, the same complex the team used during the 2019 NPSL season and Members Cup tournament where it played indoors.

On April 27, 2020, following a stoppage of play and subsequent extension due to the COVID-19 pandemic, NISA announced the cancellation of the 2020 Spring season.

Club

Roster 
As of March 11, 2020.

Coaching staff

Transfers

Transfers In

Friendlies

Competitions

NISA Fall season

Michigan did not take part in the 2019 NISA Fall season. On September 23, the NISA Board of Governors announced the team had been accepted into the league but would not begin full league play until Spring 2020.

NISA Spring season

Details for the 2020 NISA Spring season were announced January 27, 2020.

Standings

Results summary

Matches

U.S. Open Cup 

Michigan will enter the 2020 U.S. Open Cup with the rest of the National Independent Soccer Association teams in the Second Round. It was announced on January 29 that their first opponent would be USL Championship side Indy Eleven.

Squad statistics

Appearances and goals 

|-
! colspan="16" style="background:#dcdcdc; text-align:center"| Goalkeepers

|-
! colspan="16" style="background:#dcdcdc; text-align:center"| Defenders

|-
! colspan="16" style="background:#dcdcdc; text-align:center"| Midfielders

|-
! colspan="16" style="background:#dcdcdc; text-align:center"| Forwards

|-
|}

Goal scorers

Disciplinary record

See also
 2019–20 NISA season

References

American soccer clubs 2019 season
American soccer clubs 2020 season
2019 in sports in Michigan
2020 in sports in Michigan